Swedona is an unincorporated community and census-designated place in Richland Grove Township, Mercer County, Illinois, United States. As of the 2020 census, it had a population of 109.

References

Census-designated places in Mercer County, Illinois
Census-designated places in Illinois
Unincorporated communities in Mercer County, Illinois
Unincorporated communities in Illinois